There are many buildings called the Gulf Building. Among them:
 Gulf Building (Houston) – formerly the Humble Building
 Gulf Tower – Pittsburgh, Pennsylvania

Formerly named Gulf Building
 1515 Poydras, New Orleans, Louisiana